The 2010–11 Luxembourg National Division (also known as BGL Ligue due to sponsorship reasons) was the 97th season of top-tier football in Luxembourg. It began on 7 August 2010 and ended on 20 May 2011. Jeunesse Esch went into the season as the defending champions having won their 28th Luxembourgian championship during the 2009–10 season.

Team changes from 2009–10
Rumelange and Mondercange were relegated to the Division of Honour after finishing 13th and 14th in the previous season. They were replaced by 2009–10 Division of Honour champions Wiltz 71 and runners-up Jeunesse Canach.

Käerjéng 97 as 12th-placed team had to compete in a single play-off match against 3rd-placed Division of Honour side Oberkorn. Käerjéng 97 won the match 3–1 and thus retained their National Division status.

Stadia and locations

League table

Results

Relegation play-offs
The 12th-placed club in the National Division, FC Wiltz 71, competed in a relegation play-off match against the third-placed team from the Division of Honour, US Hostert, for one spot in the following season's competition. Hostert won the match after a penalty shootout, thus winning promotion to the league for the first time in their history. Meanwhile, Wiltz 71 were relegated after one year in the league.

Top goalscorers
''Including matches played on 21 May 2011; Source: Soccerway

See also
 2010–11 Luxembourg Cup

References

Luxembourg National Division seasons
Lux
1